Marcelo Andrés Verón (born January 8, 1978 in Buenos Aires, Argentina) is an Argentine former footballer who played for 11 clubs. He played and scored for Colo-Colo in the 2004 Chilean Primera División Clausura.
He is well known in Honduras, for playing in Platense (in two spells) and F.C. Motagua.

Club career 
In 2000, he was hired by C.D. Platense in Honduras. He won the top goalscorer title in the 2000–01 Apertura with 13 goals scored and the league title in the 2000–01 Clausura against Olimpia. Verón was then transferred to F.C. Motagua in the 2001–02 Apertura, scoring 7 goals for them and winning the league title against C.D. Marathón. In 2006, he returned for a short spell at Platense, scoring 5 goals. Verón is one of the all-time goalscorers of Platense, with 28 goals in total.

Career statistics

References

External links
 
 

1978 births
Living people
Argentine footballers
Argentine expatriate footballers
Argentina international footballers
Defensores de Belgrano footballers
Club Atlético Platense footballers
Platense F.C. players
F.C. Motagua players
AD Ceuta footballers
Colo-Colo footballers
C.D. Suchitepéquez players
Chilean Primera División players
Liga Nacional de Fútbol Profesional de Honduras players
Expatriate footballers in Chile
Expatriate footballers in Mexico
Expatriate footballers in Spain
Expatriate footballers in Portugal
Expatriate footballers in Honduras
Expatriate footballers in Guatemala
Association football forwards
Footballers from Buenos Aires